Virginio Vespignani (12 February 1808 – 4 December 1882) was an Italian architect.

Vespignani was born in Rome. A student of Luigi Poletti, he was highly interested in classical architecture, becoming one of Roman neoclassical's main figures. To graduate, he helped illustrate in collaboration with the engraver and architect Rossini a work on the Antiquities of Pompei and on The Seven Hills of Rome. He later would collaborate with a book by the archeologist Edward Dodwell, published in London.

In 1850 he built the neoclassical domed Church of the Madonna dell’Archetto around the shrine of the Madonna in Palazzo Muti.  He worked for a time as papal architect, and his works in Rome include the completion, restoration and rebuilding of the external facade of Porta Pia (1868) and the restoration of Santa Maria Maggiore and San Lorenzo fuori le mura.  He was also one of many participants in the reconstruction of the Basilica of San Paolo, and rebuilt and decorated Porta San Pancrazio (1857) and (1873).

In 1869, he became the main architect of the Basilica of Saint Paul Outside the Walls. He was professor of architecture at the Academy of Saint Luke, and became president of the institution. He served on many boards and honorary memberships. He helped restore the Papal palace in Anzio. He helped design the layout of the Cemetery of Rome (Campo Verano). He helped design the Palazzo of monsignor Ferrari in Ceprano, the church of Santa Maria in Capranica, and the Palace of Marchese Chino Ferrari in Ceprano. He helped design the New Theaters of Orvieto and of Viterbo. He was responsible for organizing pyrotechnic spectacles and stagepieces for festivals in Castel Sant' Angelo He worked on the restoration of San Lorenzo in Damaso. He has been awarded as knight of the Order of San Silvestro, and that of the Order of Christ of Portugal, or the order of San Gregorio. He received the Order of the Guadalupe of Mexico, a medal from Emperor Franz Joseph of Austria, Charles the third of Spain. In 1855 the municipality of Rome conferred him a gold medal, for his work during a cholera epidemic.

References

External links
italycyberguide.com  Archived
www.info.roma.it
www.libroco.it

1808 births
1882 deaths
Architects from Rome
19th-century Italian architects
Italian neoclassical architects